Aron Elís Þrándarson (born 10 November 1994) is an Icelandic footballer who plays for Danish Superliga club OB as a midfielder.

Career

Club
On 6 October 2014, Aron signed a three-year contract with Norwegian Eliteserien side Aalesunds FK. Aron made his debut for Aalesund on 3 June 2015, in a 1-0 Norwegian Cup defeat to IL Hødd, with his league debut coming 4 days later in a 2–1 victory over FK Haugesund. On 23 December 2019, Aron signed a three and a half-year contract with Danish side OB.

International
Aron has represented Iceland at U-17, U-19 and U-21 level.

He made his senior debut against the United States on 31 January 2016.

International goals 
Scores and results list Iceland's goal tally first, score column indicates score after each Aron Elís goal.

Career statistics

Club

References

External links
 
 

1994 births
Living people
Aron Elis Thrandarson
Aron Elis Thrandarson
Aron Elis Thrandarson
Aron Elis Thrandarson
Aron Elis Thrandarson
Association football midfielders
Aalesunds FK players
Odense Boldklub players
Aron Elis Thrandarson
Aron Elis Thrandarson
Norwegian First Division players
Eliteserien players
Danish Superliga players
Aron Elis Thrandarson
Expatriate footballers in Norway
Expatriate men's footballers in Denmark
Aron Elis Thrandarson